Leif Enecrona (born 5 March 1940 in Stockholm, Sweden) is a former international motorcycle speedway rider who reached the finals of the Speedway World Championship three times.

Career
He rode for Gamarna from 1961 to 1966, winning the Allsvenskan Division 2 in 1965 and then for Getingarna from 1967 to 1978 winning the Allsvenskan four times, as well as a brief spell in the UK for the Long Eaton Archers in 1966. He won the Swedish Championship in 1968.

World Final appearances

Individual World Championship
 1966 -  Göteborg, Ullevi - 7th - 8pts
 1967 -  London, Wembley Stadium - Reserve - did not ride
 1971 -  Göteborg, Ullevi - 12th - 4pts

World Team Cup
 1966 -  Wrocław, Olympic Stadium (with Björn Knutsson / Ove Fundin / Göte Nordin / Leif Larsson) - 3rd - 22pts (4)
 1971 -  Wrocław, Olympic Stadium (with Anders Michanek / Bernt Persson / Soren Sjosten / Bengt Jansson) - 4th - 18pts (3)

Individual Ice Speedway World Championship
 1966 -  Ufa/Moscow - 15th - 7pts
 1967 -  Ufa/Moscow/Leningrad - Reserve - 1pt

References

1940 births
Living people
Swedish speedway riders